English actress Helena Bonham Carter has been acting since the early 1980s. First appearing in the television series A Pattern of Roses in 1983 before making her film debut playing Lucy Honeychurch in A Room with a View (1985) and the title character in Lady Jane (1986). She was nominated for the Academy Award for Best Actress for her role as Kate Croy in The Wings of the Dove (1997). For her role as Queen Elizabeth in The King's Speech (2010), she was nominated for the Academy Award for Best Supporting Actress and won the BAFTA Award for Best Actress in a Supporting Role. She also won the 2010 International Emmy Award for Best Actress for her role as the author Enid Blyton in the television film Enid (2009).

Her other film roles include Ophelia in Hamlet (1990), Where Angels Fear to Tread (1991), Howards End (1992), Elizabeth Lavenza in Mary Shelley's Frankenstein (1994), Woody Allen's Mighty Aphrodite (1995), Marla Singer in Fight Club (1999), Bellatrix Lestrange in four of the Harry Potter series films (2007–11), Dr. Serena Kogan / Skynet in Terminator Salvation (2009), Miss Havisham in Great Expectations (2012), Madame Thénardier in Les Misérables (2012), the Fairy Godmother in Cinderella (2015) and Rose Weil in Ocean's 8 (2018). 

She has frequently collaborated with director Tim Burton; in Planet of the Apes (2001), Big Fish (2003), Corpse Bride (2005), Charlie and the Chocolate Factory (2005), Sweeney Todd: The Demon Barber of Fleet Street (2007), Dark Shadows (2012), and playing the Red Queen in Alice in Wonderland (2010) and its sequel Alice Through the Looking Glass (2016). 

Her other television work includes the television films Fatal Deception: Mrs. Lee Harvey Oswald (1993), Live from Baghdad (2002), Toast (2010), and Burton & Taylor (2013); and television series Love, Nina (2016) and The Crown as Princess Margaret (2019–2020).

Film

Television

Theatre

Music videos

Video games

Radio

See also 
List of awards and nominations received by Helena Bonham Carter

References

External links
 

Actress filmographies
British filmographies